Festung is a generic German word for a fortress. Although it is not in common usage in English, it is used in a number of historical contexts involving German speakers:

 For historical fortresses in Austria, Germany or Switzerland
 As part of the reasoning given by the German Army (Heer) for the slow progress of the Siege of Warsaw
 For German WWII strongholds which were to be held at all costs, especially towards the end of the war: 
 Alpine Fortress or Alpenfestung
 Atlantic wall or Festung Europa — a military propaganda term from the Second World War which referred to the areas of Continental Europe occupied by Nazi Germany.
 Stalingrad (see Battle for Stalingrad)
 Warsaw (Festung Warschau) see also the Warsaw Uprising
 Poznań (Battle of Posen)
 Kolobrzeg  (Battle of Kolberg)
 Piła (Festung Schneidemühl)
 Wrocław (Festung Breslau)
 Budapest (Battle of Budapest)
 Kaliningrad (Festung Königsberg)
 For entire countries such as Norway which were heavily fortified in World War II. See Festung Norwegen.
 For proposed post war German enclaves in places such as Brest and Trondheim.
 For planned national redoubts such as Switzerland's National Redoubt (Schweizer Alpenfestung).

See also
Die Festung a Noel by Lothar-Günther Buchheim

References

German words and phrases